The 1931–32 Campionat de Catalunya season was the 33rd since its establishment and was played between 6 September 1931 and 10 February 1932.

Overview before the season
Eight teams joined the Division One league, including two that would play the 1931–32 La Liga, one from the 1931–32 Segunda División and four from the 1931–32 Tercera División.

From La Liga
Barcelona
Espanyol

From Segunda División
Europa

From Tercera División
Badalona
Júpiter
Martinenc
Sabadell

Division One

League table

Results

Top goalscorers

Play-off league

Division Two

Group A

Group B

Repechage

Copa Catalunya seasons
1931–32 in Spanish football